Snow bramble or snowy bramble is a common name for several plants and may refer to:

Rubus deliciosus, Boulder raspberry, sometimes called snowy bramble
Rubus nivalis, native to northwestern North America
Rubus parviflorus, native to northern North America